Quelque part un aigle is a 1982 album of the French singer Johnny Hallyday. The same year, it achieved Gold status for over 100,000 units sold.

Track listing
"La Caisse" 4:18
"Sage Pour Vous" 5:43
"On Va Vous en Donner du Rock" 3:59
"Mercredi Matin" 4:57
"L' Hosto" 3:30
"Mon Amerique a Moi" 4:5
"Montpellier" 4:28
"Cure de Blues" 3:42
"Decalage Horaire" 3:53
Source: Entre Violence et Violon track listing

Personnel
 Georges Doering, Bill Fowler, Éric Bouad, Slim "Slimou" Pezin, Bruno Victoire, José Souc - guitar
 Al Perkins - steel guitar
 Steve Marsion, Éric Bouad, Sauveur Mallia - bass
 Ed Greene, Joe Hammer, Pierre Billon - drums
 Steve Rucker - keyboards
 Ryan Ulyate, Roger Loubet - synthesizer
 Joel Peskin - saxophone
 The Waters, Éric Bouad, Bruno Victoire, Pierre Billon, Ryan Ulyate, Henri Loustau, John Volaitis, Ross Stein, Hervé Hochet - backing vocals
Eric Bouad - conductor

References

1982 albums
Johnny Hallyday albums
Philips Records albums